The 1981–82 English League South season was the fourth and last season of the English League South (also known as the Inter-City League), the top level ice hockey league in southern England. Nine teams participated in the league, and the Streatham Redskins won the championship. The games played by the Universities of Cambridge and Oxford were counted double. (One win/loss is equivalent to two wins/losses.)

Regular season

Playoffs

Semifinals
Streatham Redskins - Solihull Barons 23:1
Nottingham Panthers - Southampton Vikings 9:3

Final
Streatham Redskins - Nottingham Panthers 5:1

External links
 Season on hockeyarchives.info

Inter
Inter-City League seasons